Space Museum may refer to:

 Hong Kong Space Museum
 National Air and Space Museum, Washington, D.C., United States
 Planetarium, a place for exhibiting images of astronomical phenomena
 The Space Museum, a serial of the British television program Doctor Who
 Space Museum, a DC Comics science-fiction series
 Space Museum (album), by Solid Space